Kiveton Bridge railway station serves the village of Kiveton Park in South Yorkshire, England. It also served the now closed Kiveton Park Colliery which was adjacent.

The station was opened by the London and North Eastern Railway on 8 July 1929 following pressure from the local councils who considered Kiveton Park station and Waleswood station too far away from the centre of the community. The new station consisted of two flanking wooden platform linked by an overbridge, access to which was gained through the booking office, set at road level adjacent to the main road through, and linking the villages. The station was originally served by stopping services linking Sheffield Victoria, Cleethorpes and Lincoln Central.

In the 1950s the wooden platforms were replaced with concrete ones and the wooden station buildings by plain brick built structures.

Along with neighbouring Kiveton Park station it was completely rebuilt during the early-1990s with modern platforms, lighting and waiting shelters, this work being funded by the South Yorkshire Passenger Transport Executive. On completion of the work the station received new signs with the name erroneously shown as "Kiverton Bridge". These were replaced with the correct spelling by 21 May 1993. This was not the first time the name had been incorrectly shown: British Railways made the same mistake on large enamel signs in the late 1950s.

Facilities
The station is unmanned and has one ticket machine on platform 2 . Train running information is given via telephone, a customer help point on platform 1, CIS displays and timetable posters. Both platforms are fully accessible to disabled travellers and wheelchair users via ramps from the street above.

Services
All services at Kiveton Bridge are operated by Northern Trains using  and  DMUs.

The typical off-peak service in trains per hour is:
 1 tph to  via 
 1 tph to  via 

References 
"East of Sheffield", Roger Milnes. "Forward" - the journal of the Great Central Railway Society, No.16., March 1978. ISSN 0141-4488

External links

Railway stations in Rotherham
DfT Category F2 stations
Former London and North Eastern Railway stations
Railway stations in Great Britain opened in 1929
Northern franchise railway stations